BSIC is an acronym that may refer to the following:

 The Music Group and Artist BSIC (U) launched in 2020.
The ticker symbol of Basic Earth Science Systems Incorporated. 
Base station identity code, in mobile telephony; see Network Switching Subsystem section: Procedures implemented.
Banque Sahélo-Saharienne pour l'Investissement et le Commerce in Africa.